Thomas Johansson was the defending champion but lost in the semifinal 6–4, 6–4 against Richard Krajicek.

Richard Krajicek won in the final 6–4, 7–6(7–5) against Marc Rosset.

Seeds

Draw

Finals

Top half

Bottom half

References
 1998 St. Petersburg Open Draw

St. Petersburg Open
St. Petersburg Open
1998 in Russian tennis